The following bridges are known as Canal Bridge:

 The Hood Canal Bridge in Washington
 The Ship Canal Bridge in Seattle, Washington
 The Charles River Dam Bridge in Boston, Massachusetts
 The Canal Bridge near Radcot Bridge, Oxfordshire, England
 The Elbe Canal Bridge in Magdeburg, Germany